Discover: The World of Science is an American television show that ran between 1983 and 1990.

Actor Peter Graves is the on-camera host and narrator of Discover: The World of Science, a monthly, one-hour magazine-style television series which provides a human perspective on new developments in robots, science, technology, medicine, the environment, behavior and natural history. The series was typically broadcast on Wednesday evenings at 8 PM on PBS.  The series, with early episodes being underwritten by Atari and later episodes being underwritten by GTE, was produced by Chedd-Angier Productions in association with Discover Magazine.

Peter Graves hosted 24 episodes of the series.  Chedd-Angier succeeded this show with Scientific American Frontiers.

The series was periodically spoofed on Saturday Night Live with comedian Phil Hartman portraying Peter Graves.

List of known episodes

References

Further reading 
 
 
 
 
 
 
 
 
 

1980s American documentary television series
1982 American television series debuts
American educational television series
English-language television shows
Science education television series
PBS original programming